Nicholas Andrew Tsaroulla (born 29 March 1999) is a professional footballer who plays as a left back for Crawley Town. Born in England, he has represented Cyprus at youth level.

Club career

Early years 
A left back, Tsaroulla began his career with Whetstone Wanderers and moved to the Tottenham Hotspur academy at the age of 12. Tsaroulla had a successful career with the U18 team (winning the 2014 South Korea Cup and the 2016 IMG Cup) and progressed into the Development Squad, but the effects of a car crash suffered in July 2017 saw him released at the end of the 2017–18 season. He subsequently spent a year out of football in rehabilitation.

Brentford 
On 9 May 2019, Tsaroulla joined the B team at Championship club Brentford on a free transfer and signed a one-year contract, with the option of a further year. He made 31 B team appearances during his single season with the club.

Crawley Town 
After six weeks' training with Crawley Town, Tsaroulla signed a one-year contract with the League Two club on 10 October 2020, with the option of a further season. He made the first professional appearance of his career as a substitute in 2–0 EFL Trophy win over Ipswich Town on 10 November 2020 and made his league debut in a 1–1 away draw with Colchester United one month later. Tsaroulla scored the first senior goal of his career in his seventh appearance with the opener in a 3–0 FA Cup third-round victory over Premier League side Leeds United on 10 January 2021. In the post-match interview, Tsaroulla was left "almost in tears", stating that "the darkest days of pain came out as it went in". After scoring once in 21 appearances across a mid-table 2020–21 campaign, he won the club's Young Player of the Season and Goal of the Season awards. On 11 May 2021, he signed a new two-year contract with an option for a further year.

International career 
Tsaroulla was capped by Cyprus at U21 level.

Personal life 
Tsaroulla is of Cypriot descent and grew up in Winchmore Hill in north London. He attended Southgate School in Oakwood.

Career statistics

References

External links 
 

Nick Tsaroulla at crawleytownfc.com

Living people
English footballers
Brentford F.C. players
Association football fullbacks
English Football League players
1999 births
Tottenham Hotspur F.C. players
Footballers from Bristol
English people of Greek Cypriot descent
Cyprus under-21 international footballers
Crawley Town F.C. players
People educated at Southgate School